Microforms are scaled-down reproductions of documents, typically either films or paper, made for the purposes of transmission, storage, reading, and printing. For special purposes, greater optical reductions may be used.

Three formats are common: microfilm (reels), microfiche (flat sheets), and aperture cards. Microcards, also known as "micro-opaques", a format no longer produced, were similar to microfiche, but printed on cardboard rather than photographic film.

History

Using the daguerreotype process, John Benjamin Dancer was one of the first to produce microphotographs, in 1839.
He achieved a reduction ratio of 160:1. Dancer refined his reduction procedures with Frederick Scott Archer's wet collodion process, developed in 1850–51, but he dismissed his decades-long work on microphotographs as a personal hobby and did not document his procedures. The idea that microphotography could be no more than a novelty was an opinion shared in the 1858 Dictionary of Photography, which called the process "somewhat trifling and childish".

Microphotography was first suggested as a document preservation method in 1851 by the astronomer James Glaisher, and in 1853 by John Herschel, another astronomer. Both men attended the 1851 Great Exhibition in London, where the exhibit on photography greatly influenced Glaisher. He called it "the most remarkable discovery of modern times", and argued in his official report for using microphotography to preserve documents.

A pigeon post was in operation while Paris was besieged during the Franco-Prussian War of 1870–1871. The chemist Charles-Louis Barreswil proposed the application of photographic methods with prints of a reduced size. The prints were on photographic paper and did not exceed 40 mm, to permit insertion in the pigeon's quill.

The developments in microphotography continued through the next decades, but it was not until the turn of the century that its potential for practical usage was applied more broadly. In 1896, Canadian engineer Reginald A. Fessenden suggested microforms were a compact solution to engineers' unwieldy but frequently consulted materials.  He proposed that up to 150,000,000 words could be made to fit in a square inch, and that a one-foot cube could contain 1.5 million volumes.

In 1906, Paul Otlet and Robert Goldschmidt proposed the livre microphotographique as a way to alleviate the cost and space limitations imposed by the codex format.  Otlet's overarching goal was to create a World Center Library of Juridical, Social and Cultural Documentation, and he saw microfiche as a way to offer a stable and durable format that was inexpensive, easy to use, easy to reproduce, and extremely compact.  In 1925, the team spoke of a massive library where each volume existed as master negatives and positives, and where items were printed on demand for interested patrons.

In the 1920s microfilm began to be used in a commercial setting. New York City banker George McCarthy was issued a patent in 1925 for his "Checkograph" machine, designed to make micrographic copies of cancelled checks for permanent storage by financial institutions. In 1928, the Eastman Kodak Company bought McCarthy's invention and began marketing check microfilming devices under its "Recordak" division.

Between 1927 and 1935, the Library of Congress microfilmed more than three million pages of books and manuscripts in the British Library; in 1929 the Social Science Research Council and the American Council of Learned Societies joined to create a Joint Committee on Materials for Research, chaired for most of its existence by Robert C. Binkley, which looked closely at microform's potential to serve small print runs of academic or technical materials. In 1933, Charles C. Peters developed a method to microformat dissertations, and in 1934 the United States National Agriculture Library implemented the first microform print-on-demand service, which was quickly followed by a similar commercial concern, Science Service.

In 1935, Kodak's Recordak division began filming and publishing The New York Times on reels of 35 millimeter microfilm, ushering in the era of newspaper preservation on film. This method of information storage received the sanction of the American Library Association at its annual meeting in 1936, when it officially endorsed microforms.

Harvard University Library was the first major institution to realize the potential of microfilm to preserve broadsheets printed on high-acid newsprint and it launched its "Foreign Newspaper Project" to preserve such ephemeral publications in 1938. Roll microfilm proved far more satisfactory as a storage medium than earlier methods of film information storage, such as the Photoscope, the Film-O-Graph, the Fiske-O-Scope, and filmslides.

The year 1938 also saw another major event in the history of microfilm when University Microfilms International (UMI) was established by Eugene Power. For the next half century, UMI would dominate the field, filming and distributing microfilm editions of current and past publications and academic dissertations. After another short-lived name change, UMI was made a part of ProQuest Information and Learning in 2001.

Uses

Systems that mount microfilm images in punched cards have been widely used for archival storage of engineering information.

For example, when airlines demand archival engineering drawings to support purchased equipment (in case the vendor goes out of business, for example), they normally specify punch-card-mounted microfilm with an industry-standard indexing system punched into the card. This permits automated reproduction, as well as permitting mechanical card-sorting equipment to sort and select microfilm drawings.

Aperture card mounted microfilm is roughly 3% of the size and space of conventional paper or vellum engineering drawings. Some military contracts around 1980 began to specify digital storage of engineering and maintenance data because the expenses were even lower than microfilm, but these programs are now finding it difficult to purchase new readers for the old formats.

Microfilm first saw military use during the Franco-Prussian War of 1870–71. During the Siege of Paris, the only way for the provincial government in Tours to communicate with Paris was by pigeon post. As the pigeons could not carry paper dispatches, the Tours government turned to microfilm. Using a microphotography unit evacuated from Paris before the siege, clerks in Tours photographed paper dispatches and compressed them to microfilm, which were carried by homing pigeons into Paris and projected by magic lantern while clerks copied the dispatches onto paper.

Additionally, the US Victory Mail, and the British "Airgraph" system it was based on, were used for delivering mail between those at home and troops serving overseas during World War II. The systems worked by photographing large amounts of censored mail reduced to thumb-nail size onto reels of microfilm, which weighed much less than the originals would have. The film reels were shipped by priority air freight to and from the home fronts, sent to their prescribed destinations for enlarging at receiving stations near the recipients, and printed out on lightweight photo paper. These facsimiles of the letter-sheets were reproduced about one-quarter the original size and the miniature mails were then delivered to the addressee. Use of these microfilm systems saved significant volumes of cargo capacity needed for war supplies. An additional benefit was that the small, lightweight reels of microfilm were almost always transported by air, and as such were delivered much more quickly than any surface mail service could have managed.

Libraries began using microfilm in the mid-20th century as a preservation strategy for deteriorating newspaper collections. Books and newspapers that were deemed in danger of decay could be preserved on film and thus access and use could be increased. Microfilming was also a space-saving measure. In his 1945 book, The Scholar and the Future of the Research Library, Fremont Rider calculated that research libraries were doubling in space every sixteen years.  His suggested solution was microfilming, specifically with his invention, the microcard. Once items were put onto film, they could be removed from circulation and additional shelf space would be made available for rapidly expanding collections. The microcard was superseded by microfiche. By the 1960s, microfilming had become standard policy.

In 1948, the Australian Joint Copying Project started; the intention to film records and archives from the United Kingdom relating to Australia and the Pacific. Over 10,000 reels were produced, making it one of the largest projects of its kind.

Around the same time, Licensed Betting Offices in the UK began using microphotography as a means of keeping compact records of bets taken.  Betting shop customers would sometimes attempt to amend their betting slip receipt to attempt fraud, and so the microphotography camera (which also generally contained its own independent time-piece) found use as a definitive means of recording the exact details of each and every bet taken.  The use of microphotography has now largely been replaced by digital 'bet capture' systems, which also allow a computer to settle the returns for each bet once the details of the wager have been 'translated' into the system by an employee.  The added efficiency of this digital system has ensured that there are now very few, if indeed any, betting offices continuing to use microfilm cameras in the UK.

Visa and National City use microfilm (roll microfilm and fiche) to store financial, personal, and legal records.

Source code for computer programs was printed to microfiche during the 1970s and distributed to customers in this form.

Additionally, microfiche was used to write out long casework for some proofs such as the four color theorem.

Characteristics
The medium has numerous qualities:
 It enables libraries to access collections without putting rare, fragile, or valuable items at risk of theft or damage.
 Microfilm has a one to one ratio to users. Only one user can access one microform at a time. To increase this you must duplicate, distribute and store increasing the manpower needed to maintain the collection.  
 It is relatively compact, with far smaller storage costs than paper documents. Normally 75 document size pages at 24x fit on one 4x6 microfiche jacket, 240 report pages at 48X fit onto a 4x6 COM fiche.  When compared to filing paper, microforms can reduce space storage requirements by up to 95%. On the other hand using modern digital images in similar quality would reduce the storage requirements by another 0.99999999%. 
 It is cheaper to distribute than paper copy if users have related equipment to access those images. Most microfiche services get a bulk discount on reproduction rights, and have lower reproduction and carriage costs than a comparable amount of printed paper. This is dependent on the current price of film and postage as well as end user equipment availability for the needs required. This is why courts specify the printed image from film and not the film itself.  The US Supreme Court, since Nov 2017, has shown a preference to a PDF-A digital submittal over analog images. 
 It is a relatively stable archival form when properly processed and stored. Preservation standard microfilms use the silver halide process, creating silver images in hard gelatin emulsion on a polyester base. With appropriate, difficult to maintain, storage conditions, this film has a life expectancy of ~500 years. However, when temperature and humidity levels are greater than required a number of things often happen. Fungus can eat the gelatin used to bind the silver halide.  The acetate base of the film degrades also known as Vinegar Syndrome. Redox is the oxidation of the surface of the film and is often found in higher humidity areas. Regardless of temperature, blemishes (REDOX) appear on film and are caused by oxidation of materials stored with or near film. Diazo-based systems with lower archival lives (<20 years) which have polyester or epoxy surfaces are commonly used as a means to duplicate and distribute film to a broader number of users. Diazo is not used as a film master but as a duplicate of a silver based image.
 The principal disadvantage of microforms is that the image is (usually) too small to read with the naked eye and requires analog or digital magnification to be read.
 Reader machines used to view microform are often difficult to use; microfiche is very time consuming, and microfilm requires users to carefully wind and rewind until they have arrived at the point where the data they are looking for is stored.
 Photographic illustrations reproduce poorly in microform format, with loss of clarity and halftones. The latest electronic digital viewer/scanners can scan in gray shade, which greatly increases the quality of photographs, but the inherent bi-tonal nature of microfilm limits its ability to convey much subtlety of tone.
 Reader-printers are not always available, limiting the user's ability to make copies for their own purposes.  Conventional photocopy machines cannot be used.
 Color microform is extremely expensive, thus discouraging most libraries supplying color films.  Color photographic dyes also tend to degrade over the long term.  This results in the loss of information, as color materials are usually photographed using black and white film. The lack of quality and color images in microfilm, when libraries were discarding paper originals, was a major impetus to Bill Blackbeard and other comic historians' work to rescue and maintain original paper archives of color pages from the history of newspaper comics.  Many non-comics color images were not targeted by these efforts and were lost.
 When stored in the highest-density drawers, it is easy to misfile a fiche, which is thereafter unavailable. As a result, some libraries store microfiche in a restricted area and retrieve it on demand.  Some fiche services use lower-density drawers with labeled pockets for each card.
 Like all analog media formats, microfiche is lacking in features enjoyed by users of digital media.  Analog copies degrade with each generation, while some digital copies have much higher copying fidelity. Digital data can also be indexed and searched easily.
 Reading microfilms on a machine for some time may cause headache and/or eyestrain.
 It is common to accidentally mutilate, damage or lose microfilm.  Users can easily cut, fold, scratch, roll over and deface microforms very easily. Most damage to film is caused through general use where readers glass guides and dirt will often scratch emulsion, jam film in carriers and otherwise damage film through user mishandling.
 Microfilm does not allow for simple reproduction.  Film is not forever, so in order to keep the images they will require duplication to a new image.  This process from analog to analog image reduces the quality of the image by 12% or more. Over time the image will be lost if maintained in analog form only.
 Since it is analog image (an image of the original data), it is viewable with mild magnification. Unlike digital media, the format requires no software to decode the data stored thereon. It is comprehensible to persons literate in the written language; the only equipment that is needed is a device to magnify the image appropriately. Many feel, because an image can be seen with a lupe or other small device, microfilm is simple to use.  In large repositories of microfilms, it is impractical to find un indexed images amongst millions of others across hundreds of rolls of film. Microfilm described image quality is often described as legible, decipherable and illegible. Photo information on film is often obliterated by the process as the image is reduced to black and white, not halftone or grays.
 Prints from microfilm are accepted in legal proceedings as surrogates for original documents but require reader/printers to convert images back to paper. Nearly all of the analog reader printer manufactures have discontinued production and support of these units in favor of digital reproduction.
 Microfilm can be digitally converted and spread to a very large number of users at the same time with little or no added cost to the users. Digital microfilm or Computer Output Microfilm is often created from digital surrogates so there are both digital and analog images providing for a very secure backup and the ability to use the images without risk of damaging the film.

Readers and printers

Desktop readers are boxes with a translucent screen at the front on to which is projected an image from a microform.  They have suitable fittings for whatever microform is in use. They may offer a choice of magnifications. They usually have motors to advance and rewind film.  When coding blips are recorded on the film a reader is used that can read the blips to find any required image.

Portable readers are plastic devices that fold for carrying; when open they project an image from microfiche on to a reflective screen. For example, with M. de Saint Rat, Atherton Seidell developed a simple, inexpensive ($2.00 in 1950), monocular microfilm viewing device, known as the "Seidell viewer", that was sold during the 1940s and 1950s.

A microfilm printer contains a xerographic copying process, like a photocopier. The image to be printed is projected with synchronised movement on to the drum. These devices offer either small image preview for the operator or full size image preview, when it is called a reader printer.  Microform printers can accept positive or negative films and positive or negative images on paper.  New machines allow the user to scan a microform image and save it as a digital file: see the section below on digital conversion.

Media

Flat film 

105 × 148 mm flat film is used for microimages of very large engineering drawings. These may carry a title photographed or written along one edge. Typical reduction is about 20, representing a drawing that is 2.00 × 2.80 metres, that is 79 × 110 in. These films are stored as microfiche.

Microfilm 

16 mm or 35 mm film to motion picture standard is used, usually unperforated. Roll microfilm is stored on open reels or put into cassettes. The standard lengths for using roll film is 30.48 m (100 ft) for 35 mm rolls, and 100 ft, 130 ft and 215 feet for 16 mm rolls. One roll of 35 mm film may carry 600 images of large engineering drawings or 800 images of broadsheet newspaper pages. 16 mm film may carry 2,400 images of letter-sized images as a single stream of microimages along the film set so that lines of text are parallel to the sides of the film or 10,000 small documents, perhaps cheques or betting slips, with both sides of the originals set side by side on the film.

Aperture cards 

Aperture cards are Hollerith cards into which a hole has been cut. A 35 mm microfilm chip is mounted in the hole inside of a clear plastic sleeve or secured over the aperture with adhesive tape. They are used for engineering drawings in all engineering disciplines. There are libraries of these containing over 3 million cards. Aperture cards may be stored in drawers or in freestanding rotary units.

Microfiche 

A microfiche is a sheet of flat film, 105 × 148 mm in size, the same size as the international standard for paper size ISO A6. It carries a matrix of microimages. All microfiche are read with their text parallel to the long side of the fiche. Frames may be landscape or portrait in orientation. Along the top of the fiche a title may be recorded for visual identification.

The most commonly used format is a portrait image of about 10 × 14 mm. Office-size papers or magazine pages require a reduction of 24 or 25 in size. Microfiche are stored in open-top envelopes, which are put in drawers or boxes as file cards or fitted into pockets in purpose-made books.

Ultrafiche 

Ultrafiche (also "ultramicrofiche") is an exceptionally compact version of a microfiche or microfilm, storing analog data at much higher densities. Ultrafiche can be created directly from computers using appropriate peripherals. They are typically used for storing data gathered from extremely data-intensive operations such as remote sensing.

Image creation
To create microform media, a planetary camera is mounted with the vertical axis above a copy that is stationary during exposure. High volume output is possible with a rotary camera which moves the copy smoothly through the camera to expose film which moves with the reduced image. Alternatively, it may be produced by computers, i.e. COM (computer output microfilm).

Film
Normally microfilming uses high resolution panchromatic monochrome stock. Positive color film giving good reproduction and high resolution can also be used. Roll film is provided 16, 35 and 105 mm wide in lengths of 30 metres (100 ft) and longer, and is usually unperforated. Roll film is developed, fixed and washed by continuous processors.

Sheet film is supplied in ISO A6 size. This is either processed by hand or using a dental X-ray processor. Camera film is supplied ready mounted in aperture cards. Aperture cards are developed, fixed and washed immediately after exposure by equipment fitted to the camera.

Early cut sheet microforms and microfilms (to the 1930s) were printed on nitrate film, which poses high risks to their holding institutions, as nitrate film is chemically unstable and a fire hazard. From the late 1930s to the 1980s, microfilms were usually printed on a cellulose acetate base, which is prone to tears, vinegar syndrome, and redox blemishes.  Vinegar syndrome is the result of chemical decay and produces "buckling and shrinking, embrittlement, and bubbling".  Redox blemishes are yellow, orange or red spots 15–150 micrometres in diameter created by oxidative attacks on the film, and are largely due to poor storage conditions.

Cameras

Flat film
The simplest microfilm camera that is still in use is a rail mounted structure at the top of which is a bellows camera for 105 x 148 mm film. A frame or copy board holds the original drawing vertical. The camera has a horizontal axis which passes through the center of the copy. The structure may be moved horizontally on rails.

In a darkroom a single film may be inserted into a dark slide or the camera may be fitted with a roll film holder which after an exposure advances the film into a box and cuts the frame off the roll for processing as a single film.

Roll film
For engineering drawings, a freestanding open steel structure is often provided. A camera may be moved vertically on a track. Drawings are placed on a large table for filming, with centres under the lens. Fixed lights illuminate the copy. These cameras accept roll film stock of 35 or 16 mm.

For office documents a similar design may be used but bench standing. This is a smaller version of the camera described above. These are provided either with the choice of 16 or 35 mm film or accepting 16 mm film only. Non adjustable versions of the office camera are provided. These have a rigid frame or an enveloping box that holds a camera at a fixed position over a copy board. If this is to work at more than one reduction ratio there are a choice of lenses.

Some cameras expose a pattern of light, referred to as blips, to digitally identify each adjacent frame. This pattern is copied whenever the film is copied for searching.

Flow roll film cameras
A camera is built into a box. In some versions this is for bench top use, other versions are portable. The operator maintains a stack of material to be filmed in a tray, the camera automatically takes one document after another for advancement through the machine. The camera lens sees the documents as they pass a slot. Film behind the lens advances exactly with the image.

Special purpose flow cameras film both sides of documents, putting both images side by side on 16 mm film. These cameras are used to record cheques and betting slips.

Microfiche camera
All microfiche cameras are planetary with a step and repeat mechanism to advance the film after each exposure. The simpler versions use a dark slide loaded by the operator in a dark room; after exposure the film is individually processed, which may be by hand or using a dental X-ray processor. Cameras for high output are loaded with a roll of 105 mm film. The exposed film is developed as a roll; this is sometimes cut to individual fiche after processing or kept in roll form for duplication.

Computer output microfilm

Equipment is available that accepts a data stream from a mainframe computer. This exposes film to produce images as if the stream had been sent to a line printer and the listing had been microfilmed. Because of the source one run may represent many thousands of pages.

Within the equipment character images are made by a light source; this is the negative of text on paper. COM is sometimes processed normally. Other applications require that image appears as a conventional negative; the film is then reversal processed. This outputs either 16 mm film or fiche pages on a 105 mm roll.

Because listing characters are a simple design, a reduction ratio of 50 gives good quality and puts about 300 pages on a microfiche. A microfilm plotter, sometimes called an aperture card plotter, accepts a stream that might be sent to a computer pen plotter. It produces corresponding frames of microfilm. These produce microfilm as 35 or 16 mm film or aperture cards.

Duplication
All regular microfilm copying involves contact exposure under pressure. Then the film is processed to provide a permanent image. Hand copying of a single fiche or aperture card involves exposure over a light box and then individually processing the film. Roll films are contact exposed via motor, either round a glass cylinder or through a vacuum, under a controlled light source.  Processing may be in the same machine or separately.

Silver halide film is a slow version of camera film with a robust top coat. It is suitable for prints or for use as an intermediate from which further prints may be produced. The result is a negative copy.  Preservation standards require a master negative, a duplicate negative, and a service copy (positive).  Master negatives are kept in deep storage, and duplicate negatives are used to create service copies, which are the copies available to researchers.  This multi-generational structure ensures the preservation of the master negative.

Diazo-sensitised film for dye coupling in ammonia gives blue or black dye positive copies. The black image film can be used for further copying.

Vesicular film is sensitised with a diazo dye, which after exposure is developed by heat. Where light has come to the film remains clear, in the areas under the dark image the diazo compound is destroyed quickly, releasing millions of minute bubbles of nitrogen into the film. This produces an image that diffuses light. It produces a good black appearance in a reader, but it cannot be used for further copying.

Modern microfilming standards require that a master set of films be produced and set aside for safe storage, used only to make service copies.  When service copies get lost or damaged, another set can be produced from the masters, thus reducing the image degradation that results from making copies of copies.

Format conversion
These conversions may be applied to camera output or to release copies. Single microfiche are cut from rolls of 105 mm film. A bench top device is available that enables an operator to cut exposed frames of roll film and fit these into ready made aperture cards.

Transparent jackets are made A5 size each with 6 pockets into which strips of 16 mm film may be inserted (or fewer pockets for 35 mm strips), so creating microfiche jackets or jacketed microfiche. Equipment allows an operator to insert strips from a roll of film. This is particularly useful as frames may be added to a fiche at any time. The pockets are made using a thin film so that duplicates may be made from the assembled fiche.

Digital conversion
Another type of conversion is microform to digital. This is done using an optical scanner that projects the film onto a CCD array and captures it in a raw digital format. Until early in the 21st century, since the different types of microform are dissimilar in shape and size, the scanners were usually able to handle only one type of microform at a time. Some scanners would offer swappable modules for the different microform types. The latest viewer/scanner can accept any microform (roll, fiche, opaque cards, fiche, or aperture cards). Software in an attached PC is then used to convert the raw capture into a standard image format for immediate or archival uses.

The physical condition of microfilm greatly impacts the quality of the digitized copy.  Microfilm with a cellulose acetate base (popular through the 1970s) is frequently subject to vinegar syndrome, redox blemishes, and tears, and even preservation standard silver halide film on a polyester base can be subject to silvering and degradation of the emulsion—all issues which affect the quality of the scanned image.

Digitizing microfilm can be inexpensive when automated scanners are employed.  The Utah Digital Newspapers Program has found that, with automated equipment, scanning can be performed at $0.15 per page. Recent additions to the digital scanner field have brought the cost of scanning down substantially so that when large projects are scanned (millions of pages) the price per scan can be pennies.

Modern microform scanners utilize 8 bit gray shade scanning arrays and are thus able to provide quite high quality scans in a wealth of different digital formats: CCITT Group IV which is compressed black & white -bitonal, JPG or JPEG which is gray or color compression, bitmaps which are not compressed, or a number of other formats such as PDF, LZW, GIF, etc.  These modern scanners are also able to scan at "Archival" resolution up to or above 600 dpi.

For the resulting files to be useful, they must be organized in some way. This can be accomplished in a variety of different ways, dependent on the source media and the desired usage. In this regard, aperture cards with Hollerith information are probably the easiest since image data can be extracted from the card itself if the scanner supports it. Often, the digital image produced is better than the visual quality available prescan. Some types of microfilm will contain a counter next to the images; these can be referenced to an already existing database. Other microfilm reels will have a 'blip' system: small marks next to the images of varying lengths used to indicate document hierarchy (longest: root, long: branch, short: leaf). If the scanner is able to capture and process these then the image files can be arranged in the same manner. Optical character recognition (OCR) is also frequently employed to provide automated full-text searchable files. Common issues that affect the accuracy of OCR applied to scanned images of microfilm include unusual fonts, faded printing, shaded backgrounds, fragmented letters, skewed text, curved lines and bleed through on the originals. For film types with no distinguishing marks, or when OCR is impossible (handwriting, layout issues, degraded text), the data must be entered in manually, a very time-consuming process.

See also

 Historical documents
 Microdot
 Microfilmer
 Microprinting
 NewspaperARCHIVE
 Parts book
 Preservation (library and archival science)
 René Dagron
 Stanhope (photomicroscopic jewel)

Notes

References

 
 
 Metcalf, K. D. (1996). Implications of microfilm and microprint for libraries [originally published on September 1, 1945]. Library Journal (1976), 121, S5.

External links
 The Library of Congress Photoduplication Service
 
U.S. Government Scientific and Technical Information by Subject Category on Microfiche available from the National Technical Information Service
Investigations on Color Microfilm as a Medium for Long-Term Storage of Digital Data (PDF)
 
 "Can You Tell Me What Kind of Microfilm I Have?" – BMI Imaging Systems

Audiovisual introductions in 1839
Documents
Archival science
Canadian inventions
Film formats
Storage media
Library resources